Jan Jansz. de Stomme (1615, Franeker – 1658, Groningen), was a Dutch Golden Age portrait painter.

Biography
According to the RKD he was the son of a burgemeester of Franeker and became the pupil of Wybrand de Geest. He moved to Groningen in 1642 and nothing is known of him after 1658, when his daughter Pietertien had guardians appointed to look after her.

According to a family history he may have been a pupil of Rembrandt. The Groninger Museum has works by him.

References

Jan Jansz. de Stomme on Artnet
J.J. de Stomme, een 17e-eeuwse schilder in Groningen, J. Stratingh, Groningen, 1984.

1615 births
1658 deaths
Dutch Golden Age painters
Dutch male painters
People from Franekeradeel